The Blues Music Awards, formerly known as the W. C. Handy Awards (or "The Handys"), are awards presented by the Blues Foundation, a non-profit organization set up to foster blues heritage. The awards were originally named in honor of W. C. Handy, "Father of the Blues." The first award was presented in 1980 and is "universally recognized as the highest accolade afforded musicians and songwriters in blues music." In 2006, the awards were renamed Blues Music Awards in an effort to increase public appreciation of the significance of the awards.

The are presented annually in Memphis, Tennessee, where the Blues Foundation is located, although the 2008 award ceremony was held in Tunica, Mississippi. The 39th Blues Music Awards was held on May 10, 2018, at the Memphis Cook Convention Center in Memphis. Two new award categories had been announced (Instrumentalist-Vocals and Blues Rock Artist of the Year) bringing the number of awards to be presented up to 26 in total. The 40th Blues Music Awards took place on May 9, 2019, with the Historical Album of the Year category being dropped, reducing the overall number to 25.

The 41st ceremony was scheduled for May 7, 2020, but the live event was cancelled due to the COVID-19 pandemic. The 2020 winners were announced at a "virtual" event. The 42nd ceremony was again presented at a virtual event on June 6, 2021.

The 43rd ceremony took place on May 5, 2022, as the first in-person event since 2019.

2022

2021

2020

2019

2018

2017

2016

2015

2014

2011

References

External links 
 Blues Music Awards Information

American music awards
Blues music awards
1980 establishments in the United States